Maindsher Kyiv has a professional beach soccer team based in Kyiv, Ukraine.

Honours

Ukrainian competitions
Ukrainian Beach Soccer Premier League
 Winners: 2003, 2006, 2009, 2012
 Runners-up: 2002, 2005, 2008, 2010, 2011
 Third Place: 2004

International competitions

Notable former players
  Vitaliy Sydorenko
  Oleh Zborovskyi

External links
  Ukrainian Beach Soccer Association Official website
  Beach soccer on the FFU
  Profile on Kyiv Beach Soccer League

Sport in Kyiv
Ukrainian beach soccer clubs